The 2017 Men's EuroHockey Club Trophy was the 41st edition of the men's EuroHockey Club Trophy, Europe's secondary club field hockey tournament organized by the European Hockey Federation. It was held from 2 to 5 June 2017 in Elektrostal, Russia.

Rotweiss Wettingen won their second title by defeating Arminen 1–0 in the final. The hosts Dinamo Elektrostal won the bronze medal by defeating Grove Menzieshill 4–0.

Qualified teams
The following eight teams with the following seeding participated in the tournament.

 Dinamo Elektrostal
 Arminen
 Grove Menzieshill
 Slavia Prague
 Rotweiss Wettingen
 Paolo Bonomi
 AHTC Wien
 Minsk

Preliminary round

Pool A

Pool B

Classification round

Seventh place game

Fifth place game

Third place game

Final

Final standings
 Rotweiss Wettingen
 Arminen
 Dinamo Elektrostal
 Grove Menzieshill
 Minsk
 AHTC Wien
 Paolo Bonomi
 Slavia Prague

See also
2016–17 Euro Hockey League
2017 Women's EuroHockey Club Trophy

References

Men's EuroHockey Club Trophy
Club Trophy
International field hockey competitions hosted by Russia
EuroHockey Club Trophy
EuroHockey Club Trophy